A ceacheí (also known as cehacheí) is a battle cry that is usually used in sports events to encourage a Chilean representative. This chilenism arises from the Spanish spelling of the first three letters of the name "Chile", which is usually given to two voices that later join for its ending, in the following way:

 Voice 1: Ce, hache, i... ("C, H, I...") 
 Voice 2: Chi ! 
 Voice 1: Ele, e... ("L, E...") 
 Voice 2: Le! 
 Both: Chi, chi, chi, le, le, le, viva Chile! ("Chi, chi, chi, le, le, le, long live Chile!")

Occasionally the voice 1 prefixes the phrase: ¡Atención chilenos de corazón! ("Attention Chileans of heart!") Although the clamor was born in sporting contexts, it was converted into an element of strong national roots and has been used on various occasions, such as celebrations or demonstrations.

History

During the V South American Championship of Athletics in 1927, held in the city of Santiago, the head of the Chilean supporters, Osvaldo Paco Vera, guided the shout to encourage the Chilean athletes who disputed the tournament. According to the story of sports journalist Carlos Zeda in Los Sports magazine, the first time in which it was employed was on April 17, as he harangued Manuel Plaza on his last day of participation, when he won.

In his book The Memoirs of Mister Huifa (1986), the reporter Renato González narrated that he had heard it for the first time during the participation of the Chilean decathletes Erwin Gevert, Serapio Cabello and Carlos Jahnke. This test of the program finally gave the victory to Chile, so the Ceacheí took importance and was popularized.

In 1933, it was institutionalized by architecture students from the University of Chile during a Fiesta Bufa, a sort of study tour. During the trip on the Reina del Pacífico boat to the city of Antofagasta, Julio Cordero outlined the first lines of the Romántico viajero (Romantic Traveler) the anthem of the club, which they ended with the Ceacheí.

It remained as the emblem of the university until 1960, when the final chorus phrase "Chi, chi, chi, le, le, le, Universidad de Chile!" Was transformed into "viva Chile!" by trumpeter Jorge Yuraidini, leader of the Chilean fans in the VIII South American Basketball Championship for Women in Santiago, won by Chile. Likewise, most of the other sports clubs in the country adopted it by modifying the final part. In the song of the local band Los Ramblers "El rock del Mundial" (The World Cup Rock, 1962), which was the official song of the 1962 FIFA World Cup in Chile, is possible to listen to the lines of his chorus "Gol de Chile / un sonoro ceacheí y bailemos rock and roll" (Goal of Chile / a sonorous ceacheí and let's dance Rock and Roll).

In 2010, the Diccionario de uso del español de Chile (Dictionary on the use of Spanish in Chile) by the Chilean Academy of Language was published, incorporating ceacheí as a Chileanism. According to its authors, "ceacheí" was probably the most Chilean word incorporated in his work. Over the years, the cry has been converted into a transverse symbol and occupied on several occasions, as during the rescue of the 33 miners of the San José mine in 2010, who chanted the ceacheí on their first contact with the surface and then on multiple occasions once they left their confinement.

References

Chilean culture
Chilean nationalism